Ceratomyxa is a genus of myxozoan.

Species
The following species are recognized:

 Ceratomyxa abbreviata (Davis, 1917)
 Ceratomyxa acanthopagri (Zhao & Song, 2003)
 Ceratomyxa acanthuri Kpatcha, Diebakate, Faye & Toguebaye, 1996
 Ceratomyxa adeli (Bakay & Grudnev, 1998)
 Ceratomyxa aggregata Davis, 1917
 Ceratomyxa agilis Thélohan, 1892
 Ceratomyxa allantoidea Gaevskaya & Kovaljova, 1984
 Ceratomyxa amatea (Aseeva, 2001)
 Ceratomyxa ammodytis Zhao & Song, 2003
 Ceratomyxa ampla (Kovaljova, Rodjuk & Grudnev, 2002)
 Ceratomyxa anguillae Tuzet & Ormieres, 1957
 Ceratomyxa angusta Meglitsch, 1960
 Ceratomyxa annulata (Meglitsch, 1960)
 Ceratomyxa antarctica Kovaljova, Rodjuk & Grudney, 2002
 Ceratomyxa apogoni (Narasimhamurti, Kalavati, Anuradha & Padma Dorothy, 1990)
 Ceratomyxa appendiculata Thélohan, 1892
 Ceratomyxa arcuata Thelohan, 1895
 Ceratomyxa artedielli Polyanskii, 1955
 Ceratomyxa aspera Aseeva, 2003
 Ceratomyxa auerbachi Kabata, 1962
 Ceratomyxa auratae Rocha, Casal, Rangel, Castro, Severino, Azevedo & Santos, 2015
 Ceratomyxa azonusi Aseeva, 2003
 Ceratomyxa beloneae Lubat, Radujkovic, Marques & Bouix, 1989
 Ceratomyxa beveridgei (Moser, Kent & Dennis, 1989)
 Ceratomyxa bryanti Gunter & Adlard, 2008
 Ceratomyxa burgerae Gunter & Adlard, 2008
 Ceratomyxa capricornensis Gunter & Adlard, 2008
 Ceratomyxa castigata Meglitsch, 1960
 Ceratomyxa castigatoides Meglitsch, 1960
 Ceratomyxa centriscopsi Gunter & Adlard, 2010
 Ceratomyxa chromis Lubat, Radujkovic, Marques & Bouix, 1989
 Ceratomyxa coelorhyncha (Yoshino & Noble, 1973)
 Ceratomyxa constricta Meglitsch, 1960
 Ceratomyxa coris Georgévitch, 1916
 Ceratomyxa cottoidii Reed, Basson, Van As & Dykova, 2007
 Ceratomyxa cribbi Gunter & Adlard, 2008
 Ceratomyxa declivis Meglitsch, 1960
 Ceratomyxa dehoopi Reed, Basson, Van As & Dykova, 2007
 Ceratomyxa dennisi Gunter & Adlard, 2008
 Ceratomyxa diplodae Lubat, Radujkovic, Marques & Bouix, 1989
 Ceratomyxa drepanopsettae Averintzev, 1908
 Ceratomyxa dubia Dunkerley, 1921
 Ceratomyxa durusa Aseeva, 2003
 Ceratomyxa elegans Jameson, 1929
 Ceratomyxa ellipsoidea Kovaljova, Rodjuk & Grudney, 2002
 Ceratomyxa elongata Meglitsch, 1960
 Ceratomyxa etrumuci (Dogiel, 1948)
 Ceratomyxa faba Meglitsch, 1960
 Ceratomyxa falcatus Gunter & Adlard, 2008
 Ceratomyxa fisheri Jameson, 1929
 Ceratomyxa flexa Meglitsch, 1960
 Ceratomyxa fujitai Gunter & Adlard, 2010
 Ceratomyxa galeata Jameson, 1929
 Ceratomyxa gemmaphora Meglitsch, 1960
 Ceratomyxa ghaffari Ali, Abdel-Baki & Sakran, 2006
 Ceratomyxa gibba Meglitsch, 1960
 Ceratomyxa globulifera Thélohan, 1895
 Ceratomyxa hama Meglitsch, 1960
 Ceratomyxa hepseti (Thélohan, 1895)
 Ceratomyxa herouardi Georgévitch, 1916
 Ceratomyxa hokarari Meglitsch, 1960
 Ceratomyxa honckenii Reed, Basson, Van As & Dykova, 2007
 Ceratomyxa hopkinsi Jameson, 1929
 Ceratomyxa huanghaiensis Zhao & Song, 2003
 Ceratomyxa hungarica Molnar, 1992
 Ceratomyxa inaequalis Doflein, 1898
 Ceratomyxa inconstans Jameson, 1929
 Ceratomyxa informis (Auerbach, 1910)
 Ceratomyxa insolita Meglitsch, 1960
 Ceratomyxa intexua Meglitsch, 1960
 Ceratomyxa inversa Meglitsch, 1960
 Ceratomyxa kenti Gunter & Adlard, 2008
 Ceratomyxa kovaljovae (Bakay & Grudnev, 1998)
 Ceratomyxa labracis Sitjá-Bobadilla & Alvarez-Pellitero, 1993
 Ceratomyxa lata Dunkerley, 1921
 Ceratomyxa lateolabracis Zhao & Song, 2003
 Ceratomyxa latesi (Chakravarty, 1943)
 Ceratomyxa laxa Meglitsch, 1960
 Ceratomyxa lepidopusi Gunter & Adlard, 2010
 Ceratomyxa lianoides Aseeva, 2003
 Ceratomyxa limandae Fujita, 1923
 Ceratomyxa linospora Doflein, 1898
 Ceratomyxa longipes (Auerbach, 1910)
 Ceratomyxa longispina Petruschewsky, 1932
 Ceratomyxa lovei Gunter & Adlard, 2010
 Ceratomyxa lubati Gunter & Adlard, 2010
 Ceratomyxa lunula Gunter & Adlard, 2008
 Ceratomyxa macroformis (Gaevskaya & Kovaljova, 1984)
 Ceratomyxa macronesi (Chakravarty, 1943)
 Ceratomyxa macrospora (Auerbach, 1909)
 Ceratomyxa macrouridonum Gunter & Adlard, 2010
 Ceratomyxa maenae Georgévitch, 1929
 Ceratomyxa markewitchi Iskov & Karataev, 1984
 Ceratomyxa maxima Gaevskaya & Kovaljova, 1980
 Ceratomyxa merlangi Zaika, 1966
 Ceratomyxa minima (Meglitsch, 1960)
 Ceratomyxa minuta Meglitsch, 1960
 Ceratomyxa moenei Meglitsch, 1960
 Ceratomyxa moseri Gunter & Adlard, 2008
 Ceratomyxa mylionis (Ishizaki, 1960)
 Ceratomyxa myxocephala Aseeva, 2002
 Ceratomyxa nebulifera (Zhao & Song, 2003)
 Ceratomyxa nitida Meglitsch, 1960
 Ceratomyxa noblei Gunter & Adlard, 2010
 Ceratomyxa nototheniae Kovaljova, Rodjuk & Grudney, 2002
 Ceratomyxa opisthocornata (Evdokimova, 1977)
 Ceratomyxa orientalis (Dogiel, 1948)
 Ceratomyxa orthospora Kovaljova, Rodjuk & Grudney, 2002
 Ceratomyxa ovalis (Kovaljova & Gaevskaya, 1983)
 Ceratomyxa pallida Thélohan, 1895
 Ceratomyxa parva (Thélohan, 1895)
 Ceratomyxa peculiaria Yurakhno, 1991
 Ceratomyxa pegusae Kpatcha, Diebakate & Toguebaye, 1996
 Ceratomyxa physiculusi Gunter & Adlard, 2010
 Ceratomyxa pinguis (Meglitsch, 1960)
 Ceratomyxa platichthys (Fujita, 1923)
 Ceratomyxa polymorpha Meglitsch, 1960
 Ceratomyxa priacanthi Kalavati, Dorothy & Pandian, 2002
 Ceratomyxa quadritaenia (Kovaljova & Zubchenko, 1984)
 Ceratomyxa quingdaoensis Zhao & Song, 2003
 Ceratomyxa ramosa Averintzev, 1908
 Ceratomyxa rara Kovaljova, Gaevskaya & Krasin, 1986
 Ceratomyxa recta Meglitsch, 1960
 Ceratomyxa renalis Meglitsch, 1960
 Ceratomyxa reticulata Thélohan, 1895
 Ceratomyxa scissura (Davis, 1917)
 Ceratomyxa scorpaenarum Labbé, 1899
 Ceratomyxa sebastici (Zhao & Song, 2003)
 Ceratomyxa sewelli Gunter & Adlard, 2008
 Ceratomyxa sparusaurati Sitjá-Bobadilla Palenzuela & Alvarez-Pellitero, 1995
 Ceratomyxa sphaerulosa Thélohan, 1892
 Ceratomyxa subelegans (Laird, 1953)
 Ceratomyxa subtilis Meglitsch, 1960
 Ceratomyxa talboti Gunter & Adlard, 2008
 Ceratomyxa tenuispora Kabata, 1960
 Ceratomyxa thrissoclesi Padma Dorothy, Kalavati & Vaidchi, 1998
 Ceratomyxa thunni Mladineo & Bocina, 2006
 Ceratomyxa torquata Meglitsch, 1960
 Ceratomyxa trichiuri Kpatcha, Diebakate, Faye & Toguebaye, 1996
 Ceratomyxa truncata Thélohan, 1895
 Ceratomyxa uncinata Meglitsch, 1960
 Ceratomyxa vepallida Meglitsch, 1960
 Ceratomyxa vikrami (Tripathi, 1948)

Seven additional species have been proposed, but have not been accepted yet:

 Ceratomyxa brayi Gunter & Adlard, 2009
 Ceratomyxa cutmorei Gunter & Adlard, 2009
 Ceratomyxa gleesoni Gunter & Adlard, 2009
 Ceratomyxa hooperi Gunter & Adlard, 2009
 Ceratomyxa nolani Gunter & Adlard, 2009
 Ceratomyxa whippsi Gunter & Adlard, 2009
 Ceratomyxa yokoyamai Gunter & Adlard, 2009

References

External links 
 
 
 

Ceratomyxidae
Cnidarian genera